Club Bàsquet Menorca is a Spanish basketball club based in Mahón, Balearic Islands.

History
Bàsquet Menorca was founded in 2016 with the aim to reach again the professional basketball after the dissolution of former Liga ACB team Menorca Bàsquet. In its first season, the club played in Liga EBA with the place of the Balearic multi-sports club CCE Sant Lluís, based in the namesake municipality that played the previous season in the same league.

The 2017–18 season was the first one of the club with the name of Club Bàsquet Menorca, starting to play its home matches at Pavelló Menorca. It ended the season with a promotion at home to LEB Plata, third tier.

Season by season

Current roster

References

External links 
 Official website
 Profile at FEB.es

Basketball teams in the Balearic Islands
Liga EBA teams
Basketball teams established in 2017
Sport in Menorca
Mahón